SAO 206462 is a young star, surrounded by a circumstellar disc of gas and clearly defined spiral arms. It is situated about 460 light-years away from Earth in the constellation Lupus. The presence of these spiral arms seems to be related to the existence of planets inside the disk of gas surrounding the star. The disk's diameter is about twice the size of the orbit of Pluto.

Discovery 
The discovery of this object was presented in October 2011 by Carol Grady, astronomer of Eureka Scientific, headquartered in the Goddard Space Flight Center at NASA. It was the first of this class that exhibited a high degree of clarity and was made  using several space telescopes (Hubble, FUSE, Spitzer) and earth telescopes (Gemini Observatory and Subaru Telescope, situated in Hawaii), through an international research program of young stars and of stars with planets. A number of astronomers of different observatories collaborated.

References 

Lupus (constellation)
Astronomical objects discovered in 2011
Astrophysics
F-type main-sequence stars
Durchmusterung objects